The Hangendgletscherhorn is a mountain of the Bernese Alps, located in the Urbachtal in the canton of Bern. On its northern side it overlooks the Gauli Glacier.

References

External links
Hangendgletscherhorn on Hikr

Mountains of the Alps
Alpine three-thousanders
Mountains of Switzerland
Mountains of the canton of Bern